Red Riding Hoodwinked is a "Looney Tunes" cartoon animated short starring Tweety and Sylvester. Released October 29, 1955, the cartoon is directed by Friz Freleng. The voices are performed by Mel Blanc and June Foray.

The cartoon was Warner Bros.' latest adaptation of the "Little Red Riding Hood" children's story, with the Big Bad Wolf and Granny playing their respective roles, with Tweety and Sylvester taking appropriate sides.

Unlike her previous appearances, the usually cheerful Granny here is a female caricature of Ralph Kramden (of television's The Honeymooners), complete with ill-temperedness and use of the catchphrase, "One of these days, one of these days...POW! Right in the kisser!" As such, "Red Riding Hoodwinked" marked one of the earliest parodies of The Honeymooners. In addition, Granny's appearance is updated: although she appears as a sourpuss here, her physical attributes (such as a less-pronounced chin) would be used in future appearances. Also, Granny's old-fashioned ways would be de-emphasized.

The wolf character would re-appear in "Hare-Less Wolf", albeit designed differently and given the name Charles M. Wolf.

Plot
The story begins much like the classic fairy tale, with Red Riding Hood, who lives in the city, off to see her grandmother, who lives in the woods. The present she plans to bring her grandmother is Tweety (in his cage). Sylvester sees Red's cargo and immediately begins going after her, his primary interest being Tweety. Red boards the bus, but Sylvester continues after her as it drives into the woods, the inattentive cat striking a road sign along the way.

In the woods, the Big Bad Wolf — rougher looking in appearance than in later shorts — waits for Red to come by. A sign announces who Big Bad is, which annoys him. Sylvester overhears the requisite exchange of Big Bad asking Red where she is headed and soon joins Big Bad in trying to reach Granny's house first. In fact, both villains nearly beat each other up trying to be "Grandma" to catch their prey ("You're musclin' in on my racket!")

Big Bad ousts Granny from the house, to which she immediately swears revenge (mimicking Ralph Kramden's signature "POW! Right in the kisser!" line; when this short was released, The Honeymooners was at the peak of its popularity). Big Bad and Sylvester hurriedly dress in Granny's clothing in anticipation of Red's arrival. Big Bad takes his place in the bed after shooing Sylvester underneath it. Once Red arrives and presents "Grandma" with Tweety, she sets it down as asked; Sylvester immediately approaches the cage, prompting Tweety to ask: "Hewwo, Wittle Wed Widing Hood's gwandma! Whatcha doin' under da bed?" After the signature exchange ending with "The better to see, and smell, and eat you with," and each character's realization of their sworn enemy (Red: "Oh! The Big Bad Wolf!" Tweety: "Eek! The big bad puddy tat!"), the chase begins.

After several back-and-forth chases, with Big Bad and Sylvester both getting the worse end of things, Red and Tweety flee Granny's home and head for the nearest bus stop. Their pursuers chase after the bus and immediately board at the next stop, only to be forcibly ejected and punched by the bus driver. That driver is none other than Granny, who then shouts, "I told 'em, one of these days...!" Red and Tweety supply the rest of the line: "POW! Right/wight in the kisser!" The screen irises out.

Voices
Mel Blanc as Sylvester, Tweety, Big Bad Wolf
June Foray as Granny, Red Riding Hood

See also
List of American films of 1955

References

External links

Nuance and Suggestion in the Tweety and Sylvester Series - Written by Kevin McCorry

1955 animated films
Looney Tunes shorts
Short films directed by Friz Freleng
Films based on Little Red Riding Hood
1950s Warner Bros. animated short films
American films about revenge
American parody films
Fairy tale parody films
Films scored by Milt Franklyn
1955 short films
Animated films about cats
Animated films about birds
Animated films about wolves
Tweety films
Sylvester the Cat films
1950s English-language films
American animated short films